Land is a traditional district in Innlandet county, Norway. The area consists of the municipalities Nordre Land and Søndre Land. Land is centered on the northern part of Randsfjorden, to the southeast of the district of Valdres.

In the early Viking Age, before Harald Fairhair was king, Land was a petty kingdom. For centuries, the area of Land was a parish within the Church of Norway. On 1 January 1838, the parish of Land was established as the new Land Municipality after the new formannskapsdistrikt law was passed, establishing municipal governments across Norway. That municipality was short-lived and in 1847, it was split into Nordre Land and Søndre Land. By the time of the partition, Land had a population of 9,199.

References

 
Districts of Innlandet
Valleys of Innlandet
Petty kingdoms of Norway